The Goyang Geumjeong Cave massacre was a massacre of over 153 unarmed civilians conducted between 9 October 1950 and 31 October 1950 by police in Goyang, Gyeonggi-do district of South Korea. After the victory of the Second Battle of Seoul, South Korean authorities arrested and summarily executed several individuals along with their families on suspicion of sympathizing with North Korea. The killings in Goyang coincided with the Namyangju massacre in nearby Namyangju.

In 1995 the bodies of the 153 victims were excavated by their families. In June 2006 the Truth and Reconciliation Commission demanded that the South Korean government apologize and erect a monument for the victims. However, the government did not show any intention of following through on the TRCK recommendation. In 2007 the Truth and Reconciliation Commission again demanded that the government apologize, provide compensation, and erect a memorial for the victims; however, the government still refused. The Truth and Reconciliation Commission also clarified most of the victims, including 8 teenagers and 7 women, had no relation to rebels.

On November 28, 2011, the Seoul central court ordered the South Korean government to apologize, pay reparations and fund a memorial to the victims' families.

See also
Truth and Reconciliation Commission (South Korea)
Bodo League massacre
Jeju Uprising
Mungyeong massacre
Geochang massacre
List of massacres in South Korea

References

External links
Truth and Reconciliation Activities of the Past Three Years Truth and Reconciliation Commission, Republic of Korea

Massacres in South Korea
Political repression in South Korea
Police brutality in Asia
Goyang
Mass murder in 1950
Korean War crimes
Massacres committed by South Korea
South Korean war crimes
War crimes in South Korea
Military scandals
1950 in South Korea
National law enforcement agencies of South Korea
Anti-communism in South Korea
Political and cultural purges
October 1950 events in Asia
1950 murders in South Korea
Massacres in 1950
History of Gyeonggi Province